The 2011–12 SEC women's basketball season began with practices in October 2011, followed by the start of the 2011–12 NCAA Division I women's basketball season in November. Conference play started in early January 2012 and concluded in March, followed by the 2012 SEC women's basketball tournament at the Bridgestone Arena in Nashville, Tennessee.

Preseason

Preseason All-SEC teams

Coaches select 5 players
Players in bold are choices for SEC Player of the Year

Rankings

SEC regular season

Postseason

SEC tournament

Honors and awards

All-SEC awards and teams

References

 
Southeastern Conference women's basketball seasons